The Nurzec  is a river in north-eastern Poland, a tributary of the Bug River. It flows through the geographical region known in Polish as Wysoczyzny Podlasko-Bialoruskie (the plateau of Podlaskie and Belarus). Administratively it lies within Podlaskie Voivodeship and Masovian Voivodeship.

The  drainage area is contained within the mezoregions known as Równina Bielska (the Bielsk Plain) and Wysoczyzna Wysokomazowiecka (the High Masovian Plateau).

The Nurzec rises in swamps south-east of Czeremcha near Stawiszcze close to the border with Belarus. Its confluence with the Bug River is close to the village of Wojtkowice Stare just south of Ciechanowiec.

Tributaries
Left bank: Nurczyk, Leszczka, Czarna, Siennica, Kukawka, Pełchówka
Right bank: Bronka, Mień (with Markówka)

Towns and villages
Major towns and villages lying on the Nurzec:
Czeremcha
Kleszczele
Boćki
Brańsk
Ciechanowiec

References
Description of the Podlasie/Belarus plateau

Rivers of Poland
Rivers of Podlaskie Voivodeship